Feel (stylized as FEEL) is the eleventh studio and second bilingual (English–Japanese) album by Japanese recording artist Namie Amuro. It serves as the singer's first record with Dimension Point—a sub-label through Avex Trax—on July 10, 2013 in three physical formats, and for digital consumption. The album was primarily handled by Western producers, such as Zedd, Dsign Music, Anthony Maniscalco, Steven Lee, amongst others. Stylistically, Feel encompasses a wide range of mid-to-uptempo electronic dance styles including electropop, house, and contemporary dance music, and focuses on themes of love, having fun, and empowerment.

Feel received generally favorable reviews from music critics. Majority of the reviews praised the singer's transition into dance music, and complimented the album's polished production, whereas some felt certain tracks lacked innovation and surprise. Commercially, the album was a success in Japan, peaking at number one on the Oricon Albums Chart and Billboard Hot Albums Sales Chart. It was certified platinum by the Recording Industry Association of Japan (RIAJ) for shipments of 250,000 units, and sold over 400,000 copies in total. The album experienced success in other Asian territories, charting in both South Korea and Taiwan respectively.

In order to promote the album, Amuro released five singles: "Big Boys Cry" and "Beautiful" were distributed as a double A-side bundle, but resulted in being one of her lowest-selling efforts in Japan. Additionally, three digital recordings—"Contrail", "Hands on Me" and "Heaven"—experienced success on digital charts throughout the same region. Furthermore, Amuro promoted the album's material on her Feel Tour 2013, which traveled throughout Japan and different parts of Asia; a live DVD with the same name was distributed the following year.

Background and production

As part of Amuro's 20th career celebration in 2012, she released her first bilingual studio album Uncontrolled in June. Not only was the record a shift from her traditional urban style to contemporary electronic dance music, but it was the first time Amuro worked with a team of international songwriters and music producers. In February 2013, publications in Japan confirmed that Amuro was working on a new studio album, and would precede with the album's first single that same year; this turned out to be the A-side release "Big Boys Cry" and "Beautiful". That same year, Amuro launched her own record label Dimension Point, in partnership with Avex Trax and their management. Originally, the singer had intended to depart from Avex and the management company Vision Factory after seventeen years together. However, Avex confirmed that Dimension Point would be put in place to allow Amuro to take control of her music and personal ventures. Additionally, the confirmed that her album—titled Feel—would be the labels first offering.

The album was handled primarily by Western and European producers, such as Zedd, Dsign Music, Anthony Maniscalco, Steven Lee, amongst others. This was the second time Amuro worked with a group of Western producers, alongside collaborations with Asian-based artists such as Tiger, Emyli and Nao'ymt on a few tracks. Feel is also the singer's second Bilingual record; there are seven English-language tracks ("Alive", "Hands on Me", "Heaven", "La La La", "Supernatural Love", "Let Me Let You Go", and "Stardust In My Eyes"), whereas the remaining section is filled with Japanese-English recordings ("Rainbow", "Can You Feel This Love", "Big Boys Cry", "Poison"). Additionally, her single "Contrail" is the only Japanese-language track on the album—though an English version was written and pre-recorded—and an English edit of "Can You Feel This Love" was added as a bonus track to the DVD/Blu-Ray versions. The content was recorded at Avex Studios, Prime Sound Studios and LAB Recordings in Tokyo, Japan, with the final material mixed by D.O.I. at Daiminion Recordings, and mastered by Chris Gehringer at Sterling Sound Studios in New York City. This was also Amuro's final album with her management team Vision Factory, having split after 22 years together to form her own private agency, Stella88, through Dimension Point two years later.

Music and songs

Stylistically, Feel encompasses a wide range of mid-to-uptempo electronic dance styles including electropop, house, and contemporary dance music, and focuses on themes of love, having fun, and empowerment. Writing for The Japan Times, Patrick St. Michel debated the album's electronic styles as being a "bid to late-stage American success?" or "a new look for the Japanese market?". He also identified how Amuro's peers, such as Kumi Koda and Ayumi Hamasaki, also carried a similar sound on their efforts. Finally, he commented, "Feel reads like a calculated stab at Western sensibilities. More than half of the tracks here are sung in English. Many of the producers behind these songs aren’t Japanese." A writer from Billboard Japan noted the sound as "aggressive", whereas Japanese magazine CD Journal noted the "trend" of electro house and EDM music.

Feel opens with the full-English language track "Alive", an electro house number that feature "floaty" vocals from the singer, electric guitar strumming, and thick bass throughout the tracks composition. The 8-bit-influenced "Rainbow", alongside the Ryuichiro Yamaki-produced track "Can You Feel This Love?", were noted by CD Journal to be more "lighthearted" in terms of sound. Lyrically, the former song discusses how the singer has overcome a parted relationship, with the lyrics "Pictures in boxes / Your t-shirts, I threw them out," highlighted as an example, whereas the latter uses love as a metaphor for happiness and love. The album's lead single, "Big Boys Cry", experiments with hip-hop and rhythmic music from Norwegian production team Dsign Music, and was described as a female empowerment anthem. "Hands on Me" was described by St. Michel as a "lifeless in-the-club anthem", and mixes elements of complextro and a "strong bass line" that brought reminisce of the work from Uncontrolled. Additionally, CD Journal compared the sound to the singer's single "Want Me, Want Me". The album's promotional single, "Heaven", was recognized as the centerpiece to the record's electronic-influence. Produced by Zedd, "Heaven" was compared to the work of Lady Gaga.

The high-energy track "Poison" is another club number that focuses on the theme of love, whereas the following song "La La La" is inspired by dancehall and trance music. The latter track was described by St. Michel as one of her more "confiden[t]-ridden" examples on the album. "Supernatural Love"—another high-energy recording—includes heavy usage of vocoder and autotune techniques, and also borrows sonic influences of K-pop. The album's only ballad, "Let Me Let You Go", was displayed as the record's most "bravest" step away from EDM, though it was criticized for this as well. The track only features a simple piano arrangement, allowing her vocals to front majority of the track. "Contrail" is a "light" mid-tempo dance number that includes instrumentation of synthesizers, keyboards and a drum machine. However, a member at Japanese website Natalie.mu labelled it amongst many "aggressive" dance tracks on Feel. Lyrically a self-empowerment anthem, the title derives from the literal term, and is delivered as a metaphor for confidence and hope. The album closes with the song "Stardust in My Eyes", a drum n bass number that also incorporates elements of electro house, and a string ensemble.

Release
Feel served as the singer's first offering with Dimension Point on July 10, 2013, in three physical formats, and for digital consumption. All three physical formats included a standard package that includes a 12-track compact disc, whereas DVD and Blu-Ray bundles included 6 music videos. Included in the DVD/Blu-Ray formats are the videos for her songs "Alive", "Big Boys Cry", "Hands on Me", "Heaven", "Let Me Let You Go", and "Contrail". Additionally, art direction and the album's booklet was designed by Masaru Yoshikawa from AEI. First-press editions came with a digipak and a poster of the album's photoshoot, while T-shirts featuring the album cover were made available through the Vision Factory website—Amuro's management at the time. The cover art and photoshoot was photographed by Takaki Kumada, which featured black and white close-up shots of Amuro's face. For every package, Amuro covered her ears, eyes, and lips, symbolizing the actions of the three wise monkeys. In an interview with Japanese fashion magazine Numero Tokyo, Amuro stated;

Critical reception

Feel received favorable reviews from most music critics. An editorial review from Japanese magazine CD Journal commended the album's production, and valued Amuro's transition from R&B to electronic dance music. Although the review noticed the singer's more "simple" vocal deliveries, it went on to compliment her "aggressive" attitude throughout the album. They identified the songs "Alive" and "Stardust in My Eyes" as the main highlights to the record. Likewise, a generic review at Billboard Japan compliment the "aggressive[ness]" of each track.

David Cirone from J-Generation was equally positive, praising the energy in most tracks, and selected "Hands on Me", "Poison", "Supernatural Love" and "Let Me Let You Go" as the album standouts. However, Cirone did point out that Feel is "a strategically-engineered album, slickly produced and aimed squarely at the dance floor. But there’s a generic quality to most of these tracks, as if they were pulled off the rack at the dance-mix clearing house." He criticized the first half for being "forgettable" and "disappointing", and was not impressed with the songwriting and Amuro's incomprehensible English deliveries. Patrick St. Michel, reporting for The Japan Times, gave a mixed review. Although he questioned Amuro's motives in moving to electronic dance music, he chose "Alive", "Rainbow" and "Heaven" as the best songs on the record, praising their composition. However, St. Michel criticized the album's lack of consistency, stating "Had Amuro and her team focused on perfecting this sound, Feel would match up to any Western electro-pop album from 2013. Unfortunately it doesn’t...". Overall, he believed that Amuro's lack of ambition or innovation was what "holds Feel from being great."

Commercially, the album was a success in Asia. Feel debuted at number one on the daily and weekly Oricon Albums Chart in Japan, opening with a six-day sales of 247,689 copies. This became Amuro's eleventh number one album, and also became the highest first-week sales for a solo female artist that year—beating Nanda Collection (2013) by Kyary Pamyu Pamyu. It descended to number two on the weekly chart for a second run, shifting 52,007 units. In total, Feel lasted six weeks in the top ten, and stay in the top 300 chart for 45 weeks. Additionally, it was ranked the sixth best-selling album of 2014 with 382,684 copies sold in Japan, making Amuro the highest-selling solo artist in terms of album sales that year. Feel was certified platinum by the Recording Industry Association of Japan (RIAJ) for shipments of 250,000 units. Feel reached number 25 on the South Korean Gaon Albums Chart, her highest entry in the region. Additionally, the album opened at number 5 on their Overseas chart, also rendering it her highest entry on that chart. Feel reached the top spot on both Taiwanese G-Music chart, and East Asian category for a sole week. To date, Feel has sold 393,414 copies in Japan alone.

Singles
In order to promote the album, Amuro released five singles and two promotional recordings. "Big Boys Cry" and "Beautiful" were served as double A-side singles, and were distributed as the only physical releases from the album. It was also her first single to be released as a stand-alone CD, the last time being her 2005 A-side "White Light" and "Violet Sauce". Commercially, it performed moderately on the Oricon Singles Chart, peaking at number four. With only 31,543 copies sold, it resulted in being Amuro's worst-selling single in her career. "Contrail" served as the album's second single, and was published as her second digital-only release. Although it was unable to chart on the Oricon Singles Chart because of their restriction of digital sales at the time, it did peak at number eight on Billboard'''s Japan Hot 100 chart. It was certified platinum by the Recording Industry Association of Japan (RIAJ) for digital sales of 250,000 units.

In July 2013, three songs from the album were released on iTunes Store. "Hands on Me" premiered on July 3, and peaked at number 19 on the Japan Hot 100 chart. An accompanying visual was shot in Los Angeles, California, featuring the singer on a rooftop dancing to the song, and attending a pool party; cameo appearances of American girl group TLC were featured. "Heaven" premiered seven days later—the same date as the release for Feel—and reached number 26 on the Japan Hot 100. A music video featured Amuro in a neon-lit rooms, surrounding by party aesthetics and back-up dancers. Although "La La La" didn't receive a music video, it peaked at number 53 on the same chart. Additionally, the music videos to "Alive" and "Let Me Let You Go" were heavily promoted throughout Japan; the aesthetic to "Alive" was influenced by the album's photo shoot, and was used as the theme song throughout the entire campaign.

Promotion and live performances

Throughout the album's campaign, Amuro promoted several songs through various products and advertisements. For her A-side singles, "Big Boys Cry" and "Beautiful", Amuro starred in a commercial for the skincare brand Kose Esprique. Then in March 2013, Japanese network Tokyo Broadcasting System (TBS) approached and asked Amuro if she could record a theme song for their 2013 television series Flying Public Relations Office. She accepted the offered, and this turned out to be her recording "Contrail". That same month, it was confirmed that her album track "Can You Feel This Love?" would be used as the theme song for the 20th anniversary of the Fuji TV series Mezamashi TV. In September that year, "La La La" was used for the Summer range of Kose Esprique, and Amuro featured in their commercial once again. Moreover, the album was broadcast on MTV's "Artist of the Month" segment in July.

Amuro announced her Feel tour in early mid 2013. The dates were confirmed via a flyer given out with the purchases of Feel, enclosed in the album's booklet. A total of 44 shows in over 20 different cities were scheduled in Japan, spanning from August 16 at the Yokosuka Arts Theatre, Kanagawa Prefecture, and finishing on December 23 at the Fukuoka Convention Center in Fukuoka. A special website was hosted by Avex Trax during the concert tour, showing a live report and special photos from specific concert dates. An Asian leg was originally added to the concert tour, having Amuro travel to Singapore for a live show with promotion handled by Midas Promotions; this would have been the singer's second visit to the country. However, in April 2013, a tour promoter cancelled the show and cited "local promoter issues". However, Midas Promotions uploaded a press release, believing poor ticket sales and expensive rates to be the primary issue.

A live album and DVD/Blu-Ray were recorded at the Saitama Super Arena on December 1. A total of 28 songs were added on the track list, including a bonus track of "Contrail", which was recorded at the National Yoyogi Stadium First Gymnasium to commemorate her 500th live performance. Titled Namie Amuro Feel Tour 2003, the formats were a success in Japan; it reached the top spot on the Oricon DVD chart, and number two on the Blu-Ray Chart, and was certified gold by the Recording Industry Association of Japan (RIAJ) for shipments of 100,000 copies.

Set list

Shows

Track listing

Formats and editions
 Standard edition — 12 tracks across one disc. 
 First-press standard edition — 12 tracks across one disc. Pre-ordered versions included a special slipcase package, alongside a bonus B2-sized poster. 
 CD + DVD edition — 12 tracks across one disc, including a bonus disc featuring 6 music videos.
 First-press CD + DVD edition — 12 tracks across one disc, including a bonus disc featuring 6 music videos. Pre-ordered versions included a special slipcase package, alongside a bonus B2-sized poster. 
 CD + Blu-Ray edition — 12 tracks across one disc, including a bonus disc featuring 6 music videos.
 First-press CD + Blu-Ray edition — 12 tracks across one disc, including a bonus disc featuring 6 music videos. Pre-ordered versions included a special slipcase package, alongside a bonus B2-sized poster.

Personnel
Personnel details were sourced from Feels liner notes booklet.Visuals and imageryNoriko Goto – stylist
Takaki Kumada – photography
Eichi Matsunaga – nails

Akemi Nakano – hair, make-up
Masaru Yoshikawa – art direction, designPerformers and musiciansHayley Aitken – background vocals 
Namie Amuro – vocals
DaWood – instruments 
Ana Diaz – additional background vocals 
Emyli – background vocals 
Fredro – instruments 
Natalia Hajjara – additional background vocals 

HyGrade – instruments 
Adam Kapit – instruments 
Nao'ymt – instruments 
Keiichi Takahashi – guitar
Nicole Tranquillo – background vocals
Anne Judith Wik – background vocalsTechnical and production'''

Ambience – production
DaWood – production
DOI – mixing
DSign Music – production
Emyli – vocal direction
Cobra Endo – production coordination
Fredro – production
FZ from SFPR – additional programming
Chris Gehringer – mastering
Kohei Hatakeyama – mixing
High Speed Boyz – production coordination
HyGrade – production, programming

Susumu Isa – vocal direction
Hiseaki Jinbu – mixing
Adam Kapit – production, vocal production
Steven Lee – production, mixing
Anthony Maniscalo (Kobalt Music/Golden Sunset Music) – production
Nao'ymt – production, vocal direction
Kenji Sano – vocal direction
Nicole Tranquillo – vocal production
JD Walker – production
Ryuichiro Yamaki – production
Zedd – production

Charts

Weekly charts

Rankings

Certification and sales

Release history

See also
List of Oricon number-one albums of 2013

References

External links
Feel on Namie Amuro's official website. 

2013 albums
Namie Amuro albums
Avex Group albums
Japanese-language albums